Rajah R.S.R.K. Ranga Rao College popularly known as Rajah's college established in the year 1962. It has a great reputation in Vizianagaram district and has highly experienced faculty. Faculty are the gold medalist in universities, very sincere and highly disciplined. They teach the core values to the students in addition to the subject.

His Highness Sree Ravu Swetha Chalapathi Rama Krishna Ranga Rao Bahudur, was the Rajah of Bobbili estate and premier of Madras Combined State.  The people of Bobbili established this college in his name in 1962. It is committed to cater to the educational needs of the rural youth of Bobbili and its surrounding villages.  It is affiliated to the Andhra University.

The college has 18 departments and offers 16 undergraduate courses in Commerce, Arts, Biological and Physical, Computer Sciences and 4 postgraduate courses in Computer Science, Chemistry, English and Social work. College gets funds from Rajahs as well from the university grants.

Bobbili is a place known for "Saraswathi Nilayam" and a nice place for education ,  a place for the history of kings . This town has no pollution and very clean

Academics

Departments
 Department of Biochemistry
 Department of Biotechnology
 Department of Botany
 Department of Chemistry
 Department of Commerce
 Department of Computer Science
 Department of Economics
 Department of English
 Department of Environmental Studies
 Department of History	
 Department of Mathematics
 Department of Microbiology  	
 Department of Physics
 Department of Politics and Public Administration	
 Department of Social Work
 Department of Statistics
 Department of Telugu
 Department of Zoology

Coursers offered
 Intermediate course
 Mathematics, Physics, Chemistry
 Biology, Physics, Chemistry
 History, Economics, Civics
 Commerce, Economics, History
 B.Sc. in
 Mathematics, Physics, Chemistry 	
 Mathematics, Physics, Computers 	
 Mathematics, Statics, Computers 	
 Biotechnology, Biochemistry, Microbiology 	
 Biotechnology, Biochemistry, Chemistry 	
 Botany, Zoology, Chemistry 	
 B.A. in 	
 History, Economics, Politics 	
 Politics, Economics, Public Administration 	
 B.Com. in 	
 Computer Applications
 M.C.A. 	
 M.Sc. in
 Organic Chemistry 	
 Analytical Chemistry 	
 M.A. in
 English 	
 Social Work

External links
 Official website of Rajah College
 Rajah R.S.R.K. Ranga Rao College at Wikimapia.org

Colleges affiliated to Andhra University
Colleges in Andhra Pradesh
Universities and colleges in Vizianagaram district
Educational institutions established in 1962
1962 establishments in Andhra Pradesh
Uttarandhra